Wyco is an unincorporated community in Wyoming County, West Virginia, United States. Some say the community derives its name from Wyoming County,  while others believe the community was named for the Wyoming Coal Company. It is located off West Virginia Route 16. The Wyco Church is also located within Wyco.

Notable person
Bernie Casey (1939-2017), actor and American football player

References

Unincorporated communities in West Virginia
Unincorporated communities in Wyoming County, West Virginia
Coal towns in West Virginia